The Privacy Office of the U.S. Department of Homeland Security was created by Congress in 2002. It is the first statutorily required privacy office in any federal agency, whose mission is to preserve and enhance privacy protections for all individuals, to promote the transparency of Department of Homeland Security operations, and to serve as a leader in the federal privacy community. The Privacy Office is headed by the Chief Privacy Officer, who is appointed by the Secretary of the Department Homeland Security.  The Office is staffed by privacy and data security professionals, including a Deputy Chief Privacy Officer, a Chief Counsel, and advisers who work with other federal agencies as well as the DHS Data and Privacy Integrity Committee.

The Privacy Office has expertise in privacy laws, both domestic and international, that help inform privacy policy development both within the Department and in collaboration with the rest of the federal government. Its staff evaluates Department programs, systems, and initiatives for potential privacy impacts, and providing mitigation strategies to reduce the privacy impact. They also advise senior leadership to ensure that privacy protections are implemented throughout the Department.

Role of the Privacy Office within the government 

The Privacy Office is responsible for building a culture of privacy and ensuring legal compliance across the Department. They train Department personnel in safeguarding privacy and complying with federal laws and Department privacy policies. Constituents include the entire federal government, the broad community of privacy advocates, and the general public. In addition, their foreign outreach provides education on the U.S. privacy framework to other countries, international travelers, and international forums.

Responsibilities of the Privacy Office 

The Privacy Office works with every component and program in the Department to ensure that privacy considerations are addressed when planning or updating any program, system or initiative. They strive to ensure that technologies used at the Department sustain, and do not erode, privacy protections. They also implement the Department’s Fair Information Practice Principles (FIPPs) governing the use of personally identifiable information (PII) through a comprehensive compliance process.

The Privacy Office also:

Evaluates Department legislative and regulatory proposals involving the collection, use, and disclosure of PII;
Centralizes FOIA and Privacy Act operations to provide policy and programmatic oversight and support implementation across the Department;
Operates a Department-wide Privacy Incident Response Program to ensure that incidents involving PII are properly reported, investigated and mitigated, as appropriate;
Responds to complaints of privacy violations and provides redress, as appropriate; and
Provides training, education and outreach to build a culture of privacy across the Department and transparency to the public.

How You Can Work With Privacy 

Department employees and contractors
Partner with the Privacy Office when planning or updating any program, system, or initiative to ensure compliance with federal privacy laws; 
Know when to prepare privacy compliance documents, including Privacy Threshold Analyses, Privacy Impact Assessments, and System of Records Notices;
Educate yourself through the office's training programs on the proper handling of PII and when and how to report a privacy incident; and
Respond promptly to all FOIA requests.

Privacy community & the public
Contact them so they can respond to your privacy concerns or questions; and
Participate in their workshops and educational opportunities.

International partners
Learn about the U.S. privacy framework;
Partner with them to create privacy-protective international information sharing agreements; and
Help identify practical implementation mechanisms for established privacy best practices, such as the internationally recognized Fair Information Practice Principles.

Resources 

Visit their website listed below and read their Annual Report to learn more. Their contact information can also be found on their site.

See also
 Chief Privacy Officer, Department of Homeland Security
 Freedom of Information Act

Sources 
These provisions are set forth in 6 U.S.C. § 142, § 222 of the Homeland Security Act, as amended.

External links
The Privacy Office of the U.S. Department of Homeland Security

United States Department of Homeland Security
Disaster preparedness in the United States
Government agencies established in 2002
Privacy in the United States
2002 establishments in the United States